Elections to Colchester City Council are due to take place on 2 May 2024. Seventeen members of the council are due to be elected, one from each of the wards.

This set of seats were last up for election at the 2021 election. Due to the COVID-19 pandemic, the City Council election (then Borough) scheduled for 2020 was postponed one year to 2021. This resulted in the terms of councillors elected at the 2021 election being truncated to 3-years rather than the usual 4-years.

Summary

Incumbents

References

Notes

Colchester
Colchester Borough Council elections
2020s in Essex